Col du Pré (el. 1703 m.) is a high mountain pass in the Alps in the department of Savoie in France.

See also
 List of highest paved roads in Europe
 List of mountain passes

Cycling Elevation profile, map, and photos

Pre
Pre